is a railway station on the Kintetsu Utsube Line in Yokkaichi, Mie Prefecture, Japan, operated by the private railway operator Kintetsu. It is 3.6 rail kilometers from the terminus of the line at Kintetsu-Yokkaichi Station.

Lines
Kintetsu
Utsube Line

Layout
Tomari Station has a single island platform. The station is unattended.

Platforms

Adjacent stations

Surrounding area
Mie Medical Center
ÆON Power City shopping center

History
Tomari Station was opened on June 21, 1922 as a station on the Mie Railway. On February 11, 1944, due to mergers, the station came under the ownership of Sanco. On February 1, 1964 the Railway division of Sanco split off and formed a separate company, the Mie Electric Railway, which merged with Kintetsu on April 1, 1965.

References

External links

 Kintetsu: Tomari Station

Railway stations in Japan opened in 1922
Railway stations in Mie Prefecture